Pottersville is a historic archaeological site located near Edgefield, Edgefield County, South Carolina. It was the site of the Pottersville kiln, which was in existence until the American Civil War when it was abandoned. The kiln was involved in the production and distribution of the alkaline glazed wares. The Pottersville kiln site is now a large mound in a grassy field atop a hill. An adjoining depression may have been the kiln itself with the waste dumps now the mound.

It was listed on the National Register of Historic Places in 1975.

References

Archaeological sites on the National Register of Historic Places in South Carolina
National Register of Historic Places in Edgefield County, South Carolina
Edgefield County, South Carolina